Woolston is a civil parish in the Borough of Warrington in Cheshire, England, and is a suburb to the east of the town of Warrington.  It contains four buildings that are recorded in the National Heritage List for England as designated listed buildings, all of which are listed at Grade II.  This is the lowest of the three gradings given to listed buildings, applied to "buildings of national importance and special interest".  The parish is almost entirely residential, and the A57 road runs through it. One of the listed buildings is a milestone on the road, and the others are a church, a pair of cottages, and a single cottage.

References

Citations

Sources

Listed buildings in Warrington
Lists of listed buildings in Cheshire